The hooded carpetshark (Hemiscyllium strahani) is a bamboo shark in the family Hemiscylliidae found around Papua New Guinea, between latitudes 5° S and 10° S, and longitude 144° E and 153° E.  Its length is up to 75 cm. Like other longtailed carpetsharks, it can use its strong pectoral fins to walk on land for a short period of time.

Reproduction is oviparous.

Etymology
The shark is named in honor of Australian zoologist Ronald Strahan (1922–2010), who was director of Taronga Zoological Park, where the holotype lived in captivity.

See also

 List of sharks
 Carpet shark

References

 
 Compagno, Dando, & Fowler, Sharks of the World, Princeton University Press, New Jersey 2005 

hooded carpetshark
Fish of Papua New Guinea
Taxa named by Gilbert Percy Whitley
hooded carpetshark